Ben-David (also Ben David, Bendavid) is a Hebrew  patronymic surname. In Hebrew it means "son of David".  It is one of the most common surnames in Israel. It may refer to the following people:

 Abraham ben David (RABaD, 12th century CE), a Provençal rabbi and a Talmudic scholar
 Abraham ben David Caslari (14th century CE), a Catalan-Jewish physician
 Alon Ben David, an Israeli television and print journalist
 Anan ben David (8th century CE), a major founder of the Karaite movement of Judaism
 Jacob ben David ben Yomtob (14th century CE), a Catalan Jewish astronomer
 Joseph Ben-David (1920 – 1986), Israeli sociologist
 Judah ben David Hayyuj (10th century CE), a Spanish-Jewish grammarian
 Mordechai ben David (b. 1951, real name Mordechai Werdyger), a Jewish-American musician
 Naftali Bendavid, an American journalist
 Solomon ben David (disambiguation)
 Zadok Ben-David, a Yemen born Israeli artist and sculptor

See also 
 ibn Daud (Abraham ibn Daud)
 Bendemann
 Benavides
 David
 David (name)
 Davidson (name)
 Davis (surname)
 Davison (surname)
 Ben Dunkelman

Hebrew-language surnames
Jewish surnames
Patronymic surnames
Surnames from given names